is a historical Japanese derogatory term for renegade local clans, and also the name for a race of spider-like  in Japanese folklore.

The word is thought to have referred to a local clan of powerful people who did not obey the imperial court and lived in caves.

The most representative work among these tales is The Tale of the Heike, compiled in the Kamakura period (1185–1333) in the first half of the 13th century, in which it appears under the name . As the  passed through the ages, it became a more bizarre-looking . The  as a  also appeared as the subject of Noh, Jōruri and Kabuki plays.

In history

Tsuchigumo of the Katsuragi
Of the clans referred to as tsuchigumo, those of the Mount Yamato Katsuragi are particularly well known.  was said to be the remains where Emperor Jimmu captured tsuchigumo and buried their head, body and feet separately to prevent their grudges from harming the living.

In historic Yamato Province, the unique physical characteristics of the tsuchigumo were that they were tailed people. In the Nihon Shoki, the founder of the Yoshino no Futo (吉野首) were written to be "with a glowing tail," the founder of Yoshino no Kuzu (国樔) were stated to "have tails and come along pushing rocks (磐石, iwa)," presenting the indigenous people of Yamato as non-humans. Even in the Kojiki, they shared a common trait with the people of Osaka (忍坂) (now Sakurai city) in that they were "tsuchigumo (土雲) who have grown tails."

Records from the Keiko generation and others
In the Hizen no Kuni Fudoki, there is an article writing that when Emperor Keiko made an imperial visit to Shiki island (志式島, Hirado island) (year 72 in the legends), the expedition encountered a pair of islands in the middle of sea. Seeing smoke rising from inland, the Emperor ordered an investigation of the islands, and discovered that the tsuchigumo Oomimi (大耳) lived on the smaller island, and Taremimi (垂耳) lived on the larger island. When both were captured and about to be killed, Oomimi and Taremimi lowered their foreheads to the ground and fell prostrate, and pleaded, "we will from now on make offerings to the emperor" and presented fish products and begged for pardon.

Also, in the Bungo no Kuni Fudoki, there appeared many tsuchigumo, such as the Itsuma-hime (五馬姫) of Itsuma mountain (五馬山), the Uchisaru (打猴), Unasaru (頸猴), Yata (八田), Kunimaro (國摩侶), and Amashino (網磯野), of Negi field (禰宜野), the Shinokaomi (小竹鹿臣) of Shinokaosa (小竹鹿奥), and the Ao (青) and Shiro (白) of Nezumi cavern (鼠の磐窟). Other than these, there is also the story of Tsuchigumo Yasome (土蜘蛛八十女), who made preparations in the mountains to resist against the imperial court, but was utterly defeated. This word "Yaso" (八十), literally "eighty," is a figurative term for "many," so this story is interpreted to mean that many of the female chief class opposed the Yamato imperial court, and met a heroic end, choosing to die alongside their men. In the story, Yaso, one local female chief, was greatly popular among the people, and she separated her allies from those resisting the imperial forces. Tsuchigumo Yasome's whereabouts were reported to the emperor, and for her efforts she was spared.

According to writings in the Nihon Shoki, in the 12th year of emperor Keiko (year 82 in the legends), in winter, October, emperor Keiko arrived in Hayami town, Ookita (now Ooita), and heard from the queen of the land, Hayatsuhime (速津媛) that there was a big cave in the mountain, called the Nezumi cave, where two tsuchigumo, Shiro and Ao, lived. In Negino (禰疑野), Naoiri, they were informed of three more tsuchigumo named Uchizaru (打猿), Yata (八田), and Kunimaro (国摩侶, 国麻呂). These five had great amount of allies, and would not follow the emperor's commands.

Yōkai tsuchigumo

From the Japanese middle ages (Kamakura/Muromachi/Azuchi-Momoyama periods, or the late 12th to the early 17th centuries) onward, tsuchigumo began to be depicted as giant, monstrous spiders.

A commonly cited early text depicting the yōkai tsuchigumo is The Tale of the Heike, or rather some variant texts of the Heike. This work, which was passed down orally among biwa lute players, has a complicated textual history and numerous variants, including the massively expanded Genpei Jōsuiki, and some versions include an extended passage on swords, known as the "Sword Scroll", or tsurugi-no-maki. This is regarded as one of the most important and influential texts that depict the conflict between Yorimitsu and the tsuchigumo, and is the source for many later artistic representations. It describes Yorimitsu's using the sword  to defeat a yamagumo, which led to his renaming it 'Kumokiri' (蜘蛛切, "Spider-Cutter"). At present, Daikaku-ji Temple, Hakone Shrine and an individual, have tachi that have been handed down as Hizamaru, which are also called by other names such as 'Kumokiri', 'Hoemaru' and 'Usumidori' based on various legends.

Works such as the 14th-century picture scroll Tsuchigumo Sōshi and the 15th-century Noh drama Tsuchigumo envision various versions of a legend in which Minamoto no Yorimitsu, also known as Raikō, a famous 10th-century general and ancestor of the Minamoto clan defeat an enormous spider yōkai referred to as a tsuchigumo or yamagumo ("earth spider" or "mountain spider", respectively). In some versions, Yorimitsu and his retainer Watanabe no Tsuna pursue the spider, which takes various forms such as a beautiful woman, and when they defeat it they cut it open and skulls pour out of its torso, while in others, Yorimitsu is incapacitated and a young retainer hunts the spider down in his stead.

Tsuchigumo Sōshi (see scrolling image below)  interestingly contains a visual depiction that doesn't appear to match the accompanying text, as the text has Yorimitsu and Tsuna take down an enormous, 60-foot monster that they later realize is a giant spider, but the imagery shows them doing battle with two oni, or ogre-demons, resembling Gozu and Mezu, which perhaps represent another of the tsuchigumos transformations.

See also
 Jorōgumo

References

Citations

Works cited

Further reading
 Asiatic Society of Japan. Transactions of the Asiatic Society of Japan: Volume 7. The Society. (1879)
 Aston, William George. Shinto: the way of the gods. Longmans, Green, and Co. (1905)
 Brinkley, Frank and Dairoku Kikuchi. A history of the Japanese people from the earliest times to the end of the Meiji era. The Encyclopædia Britannica Co. (1915)
 Horne, Charles Francis. The Sacred books and early literature of the East. Parke, Austin, and Lipscomb: (1917)
 Monsters, Animals, and Other Worlds: A Collection of Short Medieval Japanese Tales. Edited by Keller Kimbrough and Haruo Shirane. New York Chichester, West Sussex: Columbia University Press, 2018. pp. 23-30. https://doi.org/10.7312/kimb18446-003
 
 
 Reider, Noriko T. Japanese Demon Lore: Oni, From Ancient Times to the Present. Logan, Utah: Utah State University Press, 2010. pp. 165-169 (two examples of Tsuchigumo in modern media).
 
 Studio international, Volume 18. Studio Trust. (1900)
 
 Trench, K. Paul. Nihongi: chronicles of Japan from the earliest times to A.D. 697: Volume 1. The Society. Trübner. (1896)

Mythological spiders
Shapeshifting
Japanese mythology
Mythological monsters
Yōkai